One of Us is the third studio album by the Cincinnati indie rock group Pomegranates, released October 26, 2010, on Afternoon Records. It was produced by TJ Lipple of Aloha.

Critical reception
One of Us received mostly positive reviews. Giving the album 7/10, William Goodman of Spin declares "All 13 kaleidoscopic tracks, particularly standout 'Anywhere You Go,' a supercollider of rhythmic groove, guitar, and Wurlitzer organ, distill a decade-plus of indie and alt rock into a sparking art-pop swell. Spazzing out, Joey Cook cries: 'I really like you!' The feeling's mutual." Filter's Kurt Orzeck gives the album 85% and touts they perform "with a masterful ease, smoothly maneuvering from oversize spectacle to small-scale minimalism. It’ll reel you in with authority—and you’ll beg, 'Please don’t let me go.'” In a less favorable review, Dylan Nelson of PopMatters gives the album 5/10 and says "the album’s uptempo polish invigorates the band’s sound but ultimately fails to mesh with its wistful tendencies."

Track listing
All songs written by Pomegranates

Personnel
Pomegranates
Joey Cook – Bass, Guitar, Keyboards, Percussion, Vocals
Isaac Karns – Bass, Guitar, Keyboards, Sampling, Vocals
Jacob Merritt – Drums, Percussion
Dan Lyon – Bass, Guitar, Vocals
Additional personnel
Alisa Cook – Flute, Vocals
Nigel Evan Dennis – Artwork
Ric Hordinski – Engineer, Guitar
Chris Leeds – Assistant
TJ Lipple – Engineer, Marimba, Mastering, Mixing, Producer
Paul Patterson − String Arrangements, Strings
Matthew Shelton − Vocals

References

2010 albums